Sofia Nilsson  (born 12 June 1990) is a Swedish football midfielder who currently plays for Djurgårdens IF. She has played Damallsvenskan football for Stattena IF and Djurgårdens IF.

References

Swedish women's footballers
Djurgårdens IF Fotboll (women) players
Damallsvenskan players
1990 births
Living people
Women's association football midfielders